Lale Island (literally "Tulip Island", also called Dolap Island) is an Aegean Island of Turkey. In the antiquity it was called  Kremydonisi.
It has two road connections; one to mainland Anatolia (towards south east) and the other to Cunda Island (towards west). The connection to mainland was constructed in 1817 (i.e., Ottoman era) by filing. Now a new bridge is under construction instead of filing. (see Gönül Bridge) The connection to Cunda Island is by a bridge constructed in 1954.

The island is an inhabited island mostly with summer houses. It is connected with Cunda Island by the Ayvalık Strait Bridge.

References

Aegean islands
Islands of Turkey
Islands of Balıkesir Province
Ayvalık